Charles Stepney (March 26, 1931May 17, 1976) was an American record producer, arranger, songwriter and musician. Stepney is noted for his work with artists such as The Dells, Ramsey Lewis, Rotary Connection and Earth, Wind & Fire.

Career
He started his musical career as a jazz piano and vibraphone player, and began work for Chess Records as a musician and arranger.  In 1966, Charles Stepney and Marshall Chess, son of Chess Records' co-founder Leonard Chess, created the band Rotary Connection. Stepney went on to produce the group on the Chess vanity label Cadet Concept. These were their 1967 self titled debut album, 1968's Aladdin and Peace LPs and 1969's release Songs. He also produced the group's 1970 album Dinner Music and 1971 LP Hey Love.   According to writer Paul Bowler: "The six albums that Rotary Connection recorded under Stepney's guidance proved revolutionary; a glorious fusion of styles made essential by the simpatico nature of Stepney's lush string arrangements and [Minnie] Riperton's multi-octave, quasi-operatic vocals."

Stepney went on to produce  Rotary Connection lead singer Minnie Riperton's 1970 debut album Come to My Garden. Commenting on Minnie at the time he said that she "has a soprano range of about four octaves, a whole lot of soul, she's good-looking and she's got the experience of Rotary behind her."

During 1970 Stepney also wrote, produced and conducted a Classical Jazz Symphony entitled "Cohesion". "Cohesion" was performed by the Minneapolis Symphony Orchestra, the Ramsey Lewis Trio and Minnie Riperton in Minneapolis, Minnesota.

Stepney worked with a wide range of other performers at Chess.  He began producing soul group The Dells on their 1968 album There Is. He later produced the group's 1969 release Love is Blue and their 1971 LPs Like It Is, Like It Was and Freedom Means.  He also worked with blues musicians Muddy Waters and Howlin' Wolf  , and singers Terry Callier, Marlena Shaw, and Deniece Williams, on their albums.  He is credited as a musician or producer on albums including The Soulful Strings – Paint It Black (1966) and Groovin' with the Soulful Strings (1967); Muddy Waters – Electric Mud (1968) and After the Rain (1969); Howlin' Wolf – The Howlin' Wolf Album (1969); Marlena Shaw – The Spice of Life (1969); Terry Callier – Occasional Rain (1972), What Color Is Love (1973) and I Just Can't Help Myself (1974); Phil Upchurch – Upchurch (Cadet, 1969) and The Way I Feel (Cadet, 1970).

Stepney began to collaborate with the Ramsey Lewis Trio as a producer on their 1968 LP Maiden Voyage.   The album included the song "Les Fleur" written by Stepney and later recorded by Riperton in 1970. He also arranged on the Trio's 1968 album Mother Nature's Son and 1969 LP Another Voyage, and co-produced the 1970 album The Piano Player.

With the Trio was a young drummer named Maurice White who in prior played with Chess Records. White went on to found and lead a new band called Earth, Wind & Fire. 
Stepney eventually worked as an associate producer on the band's 1974 release Open Our Eyes.

He then performed on Ramsey Lewis's 1974 album Sun Goddess and produced his 1975 LP Don't It Feel Good. Additionally Stepney coproduced with Maurice on Earth, Wind & Fire's 1975 albums That's the Way of the World and Gratitude. Stepney then went about coproducing with White on EWF's 1976 album Spirit, Ramsey Lewis's 1976 LP Salongo, The Emotions 1976 album Flowers and Deniece Williams's 1976 LP This Is Niecy.

Death
The song "Spirit" was intended to uplift Stepney's spirit and to show all the gratitude that Earth, Wind & Fire had towards him. However, Stepney never got to hear the song. Maurice White spoke to Stepney on the morning of May 17, 1976, but later that day, Earth, Wind & Fire keyboardist Larry Dunn received a phone call, informing him that Stepney had died of a heart attack.

Influence and legacy
Artists such as Ramsey Lewis, Stevie Wonder, Deniece Williams, Chaka Khan, 4hero, Jean-Paul 'Bluey' Maunick, Zero 7, and Terry Callier have been influenced by Stepney. 4hero dedicated their hit single "Les Fleur" - which he co-wrote - to Stepney and Minnie Riperton.

Personal life
Stepney was survived by his wife Rubie and his three daughters Eibur, Charlene and Chante.  Charles has five grandchildren Brandice, Darryl, Gabrielle, Lindsey and Edward Charles.  He also has two great grandchildren Rapheal and Gabriel.

See also
Albums Produced by Charles Stepney

Discography

As sideman
With Bunky GreenPlayin' for Keeps (Cadet, 1966)
With Eddie HarrisJazz for "Breakfast at Tiffany's" (Vee-Jay, 1961)For Bird and Bags (Exodus, 1963)
With Ramsey LewisBack to the Roots (Cadet, 1971)Sun Goddess (Columbia, 1974)

As arranger
With Ramsey LewisMaiden Voyage (Cadet, 1968)Mother Nature's Son (Cadet, 1968)
With Eddie HarrisPlug Me In (Atlantic, 1968) US 
With Minnie RipertonCome to My Garden'' (GRT, 1970)

References

External links
Charles Stepney - American Record Producer at The Official Website of Charles Stepney 
Charles Stepney - Interrupted Genius at Voices of East Anglia

1931 births
1976 deaths
Musicians from Chicago
Record producers from Illinois
20th-century American musicians
20th-century American businesspeople
20th-century American male musicians